Kosmos 909 ( meaning Cosmos 909) was a satellite which was used as a target for tests of anti-satellite weapons. It was launched by the Soviet Union in 1977 as part of the Dnepropetrovsk Sputnik programme, and used as a target for Kosmos 910 and Kosmos 918, as part of the Istrebitel Sputnikov programme.

It was launched aboard a Kosmos-3M carrier rocket, from Site 132/2 at the Plesetsk Cosmodrome. The launch occurred at 16:30 UTC on 19 May 1977.

Attempted interceptions by Kosmos 910 and 918 on 23 May and 17 June respectively failed, and as of 2009 Kosmos 909 remains in orbit.

Kosmos 909 was the fifth of ten Lira satellites to be launched, of which all but the first were successful. Lira was derived from the earlier DS-P1-M satellite, which it replaced.

See also

1977 in spaceflight

References

1977 in spaceflight
Kosmos satellites
Spacecraft launched in 1977
Dnepropetrovsk Sputnik program